Ronald George Stewart (July 11, 1932 – March 17, 2012) was a Canadian professional ice hockey player in the National Hockey League (NHL) from 1952 to 1973, as well as a coach. He spent the first half of his career with the Toronto Maple Leafs, and won the Stanley Cup three times from 1962 to 1964. The latter part of his playing career was spent with the Boston Bruins, St. Louis Blues, New York Rangers, Vancouver Canucks, and New York Islanders. He would later coach the Rangers for half of a season, and spent a full season as coach of the Los Angeles Kings.

Early career
After growing up in Alberta, Stewart moved to Ontario as a teen to participate in the Ontario Hockey Association, then the top ranked junior league. He won the Memorial Cup in 1952 with the Guelph Biltmores.

NHL player 
Stewart played thirteen seasons for the Toronto Maple Leafs, taking part with them in three Stanley Cup championships in the early 1960s. After his time in Toronto, he spent two seasons with the Boston Bruins (1965–1966, 1966–1967). He was chosen by the St. Louis Blues in the 1967 NHL Expansion Draft, before being traded to the New York Rangers in that same season. He spent part of the 1971–1972 season with the Vancouver Canucks, but returned briefly to the Rangers. He spent his final year, 1972-1973, with the New York Islanders.

Stewart was a very good skater and probably ranked as the fastest of all Toronto Maple Leaf players from the mid-fifties through to the end of his career with the Leafs. During team practice sessions, he usually won the end-to-end skating rushes though during league games, he didn't often demonstrate his blazing speed in the same way as did Dave Keon and Frank Mahovlich. With his 6 ft.1 in. size, Ron was particularly adept in a defensive fore-checking role and former New York Ranger coach, Emile Francis regarded Stewart as one of the very best penalty-killers in the league. Offensively, Stewart was not a prolific goal scorer but he possessed a very quick wrist shot that made him a scoring threat.

Death of Terry Sawchuk
After the 1969–1970 season ended, Stewart and Rangers teammate Terry Sawchuk, both of whom had been drinking, argued over expenses for the house they rented together on Long Island, New York. Sawchuk suffered severe internal injuries during the scuffle. Sawchuk told the police that he accepted full responsibility for the events. Sawchuk never recovered and died shortly thereafter from a pulmonary embolism on May 31, 1970 at the age of 40. A Nassau County grand jury exonerated Stewart and ruled that Sawchuk's death was accidental.

Coaching 
After retiring from play, Stewart became a coach. He was the head coach of the Rangers for the start of the 1975–76 season, but after a record of 15 wins, 20 losses and 4 ties in 39 games, was fired. His next NHL job was with the Los Angeles Kings for the 1977–78 season. He had a record of 31 wins, 34 losses and 15 ties over the season, and was not brought back for the next season.

Retirement
Stewart spent his latter years in British Columbia and Arizona. He had three children by his first wife, Barbara. He died of cancer in 2012.

Career statistics

Coaching record

See also
List of NHL players with 1000 games played

References

External links

1932 births
2012 deaths
Barrie Flyers players
Boston Bruins players
Canadian ice hockey centres
Guelph Biltmore Mad Hatters players
Los Angeles Kings coaches
New York Islanders players
New York Rangers coaches
New York Rangers players
Providence Reds players
St. Louis Blues players
Ice hockey people from Calgary
Stanley Cup champions
Toronto Maple Leafs players
Toronto Marlboros players
Vancouver Canucks players
Canadian ice hockey coaches